Ewald Hammes (born 4 August 1950) is a German footballer who played as a forward for SG Wattenscheid 09. He competed for West Germany in the men's tournament at the 1972 Summer Olympics.

References

External links
 

1950 births
Living people
Sportspeople from Koblenz
German footballers
Association football forwards
Olympic footballers of West Germany
West German footballers
Footballers at the 1972 Summer Olympics
2. Bundesliga players
SG Wattenscheid 09 players
Footballers from Rhineland-Palatinate